Hunter Carson (born December 26, 1975) is an American actor, screenwriter, producer and director. He is the son of actress Karen Black and film director L. M. Kit Carson. In 1986, he was nominated for a Young Artist Award for Best Starring Performance by a Young Actor - Motion Picture for his performance in Paris, Texas (1984).

Early life
Carson was born in Los Angeles, California, the son of actress Karen Black and actor, producer, screenwriter and director L. M. Kit Carson. He is the stepson of Stephen Eckelberry and halfbrother of Celine Eckelberry, Stephen's and Karen's adopted daughter. He made his first national appearance in October 1976, at the age of nine months, when his mother hosted Saturday Night Live; she held him in her arms for the entirety of her opening monologue. Carson is a graduate of Wesleyan University.

Career
His first acting role was in the 1984 film Paris, Texas, portraying the character of Hunter Henderson. The film was co-written for the screen by his father. Carson received strong reviews for his performance in the film. He then starred in the 1986 remake of Invaders from Mars, where he co-starred with his mother Karen Black, and appeared in the 1988 comedy drama Mr. North, which also featured his Paris, Texas co-star Harry Dean Stanton. He played Bud Bundy in an unaired pilot of Married... with Children and appeared as Peter McMichaels in the 2001 film, Perfume.  He played a "crazy killer boyfriend" in the 2010 horror film She's Crushed. He co-directed with Alejandro Itkin the 2013 feature film Single in South Beach, a romantic drama starring Kevin Sorbo.  He also directed the short With It (2004), about a failed hitman, which Andrew Dansby says echoes the style of his Paris, Texas director Wim Wenders.

References

External links

1975 births
Male actors from Los Angeles
American male child actors
American male film actors
Living people
Wesleyan University alumni
20th-century American male actors
21st-century American male actors